Live food is living animals used as food for other carnivorous or omnivorous animals kept in captivity; in other words, small preys (such as insects, small fish or rodents) fed alive to larger predators kept either in a zoo or as a pet.

Live food is commonly used as feed for a variety of species of exotic pets and zoo animals, ranging from crocodilians (crocodiles and alligators) to various snakes, turtles, lizards and frogs, but also including other non-reptilian, non-amphibian species such as birds and mammals (for instance, pet skunks, which are omnivorous mammals, can technically be fed a limited amount of live food, though this is not known to be a common practice). Common live food ranges from insects (e.g. crickets, used as an inexpensive form of feed for reptiles such as bearded dragons and commonly available in pet stores for this reason; other examples are cockroaches, locusts, waxworms and mealworms), worms (e.g. earthworms) and crustaceans, to small birds (e.g. chickens) and mammals (e.g. mice and rabbits).

In angling, live earthworms are frequently attached to fishing hook and presented as a live food to bait and catch game fish. Worms are also used as fish food for aquaria and fish ponds.

Varieties
Live foods commonly available are crickets (Gryllus assimilis, Gryllus bimaculatus, Gryllodes sigillatus and Acheta domesticus commonly), waxworms (Galleria mellonella), mealworms (Tenebrio molitor), superworms (Zophobas morio) and locusts (a number of species are seen commonly). There are however many more species used such as butter worms, calci worms (Hermetia illucens), buffalo worms, bean weevils, sun beetle grubs (Pachnoda marginata), earthworms, a variety of cockroach species (Blatta lateralis and Blaptica dubia commonly), silkworms and more. Insect species are most commonly used to feed small reptiles and amphibians.

Another common form of live food, most commonly used to feed snakes, is small rodents. The most commonly known small rodent used for live food is likely the mouse; many pet stores which carry snakes or cater to snake owners also carry "feeder mice" for this reason (see Fancy mouse). It is also common to feed reptiles freshly killed or frozen/thawed rodents as most reptiles will readily accept them.

Creatures that are the most common choices for live foods, ranging from feeder mice to crickets and mealworms, generally are bred and raised in captivity themselves, and can often be found both through local pet stores and from wholesalers or "farms" that breed them specifically for live food sales.

Animals commonly fed live food
Animals that are commonly fed live food include bearded dragons, leopard geckos and other lizards, various types of snake, turtles, and carnivorous fish. Other animals, such as skunks (which are sometimes kept as pets), being omnivorous, can also eat some live food, though it is unknown how common this is in practice.

References

Pet foods
Fishing equipment
Insects as feed